Rolland O'Regan FRCS (born John Arthur Rolland O'Regan; 1 June 1904 – 20 November 1992) was a New Zealand surgeon, activist and politician. He was the son of judge Patrick O'Regan and the father of Richard Mark O'Regan and businessman and academic Sir Tipene O'Regan.

Biography

Early life and career
O'Regan was born in 1904 and was educated at St Patrick's College. His father was Patrick O'Regan, then a Member of Parliament and later a prominent Wellington judge of the Arbitration Court.

He married Rena Bradshaw (of Ngāi Tahu descent) in 1932 and would later change his name by deed poll from John Arthur Rolland O'Regan to Rolland O'Regan.

Medical career
He received his tertiary education at the University of Otago, where he studied medicine, graduating as a doctor in 1928. He became a house surgeon at Wellington Hospital for several years, before moving to Britain to do further postgraduate studies. He returned to New Zealand and set up a medical practice of his own. He supported the First Labour Government in their reform of the healthcare system, one of only a few doctors who did so.

During World War II he served as a surgeon aboard three different hospital ships (the Maunganui, Oranje and Pacific Star) where he was largely responsible for the evacuation of wounded Allied servicemen from Burma.

Political career
O'Regan got his first taste of political activism when he became the chairman of the Citizens' All Black Tour Association that called for the abandonment of the 1960 All Black tour to South Africa. He unsuccessfully lobbied for the government to intervene and cancel the tour alongside such figures as George Nēpia and Vincent Bevan. He remained the chairman until 1966.

In 1965 O'Regan was elected to the Wellington City Council on a Labour Party ticket. He was a popular councillor, always polling highly, and topped the poll on two consecutive elections. He retired from the council in 1974. He was also a member of the Wellington Harbour Board. He was first elected in 1968 and served three years as Charman (1971–74).

Soon afterwards O'Regan was approached to stand for Labour in the 1967 Petone by-election, however he was not selected as a candidate. From 1969 to 1970 he was a member of the Labour Party executive.

Later life and death
He was famed as a tireless public advocate; as President of the Cancer Society, a member of the Victoria University Council, the Wellington Polytechnic Council, the Carter Observatory Board, and the Wellington Free Ambulance executive.

O'Regan died on 20 November 1992, aged 88, and was buried at Karori Cemetery.

Notes

References

1904 births
1992 deaths
People educated at St. Patrick's College, Wellington
University of Otago alumni
New Zealand surgeons
New Zealand military personnel of World War II
Wellington City Councillors
Wellington Harbour Board members
New Zealand Labour Party politicians
Unsuccessful candidates in the 1966 New Zealand general election
Burials at Karori Cemetery
20th-century surgeons